Hole in the Wall Vietnam is a game show that first aired on 26 December 2014. The program originated in Japan and led to 44 international versions. Two opposing teams face five challenges. The winning team facies an imposing wall in the final round. If they pass the wall, they win the game.

Gameplay 

The game consists of two teams of three people. A hobby, occupation, or a location may serve as the team names. Two lifeguards — one male, and one female — sit poolside. The contestants wear silver Spandex zentai unitards and red or blue helmets, elbow pads and knee pads. Contestants must jump through the hole without breaking it and without falling into the water. At least one foot must be in the play area at all times. A replay is shown after each wall has passed. If a wall is not cleared, a diagram is shown of the best method. The game consists of five rounds: Solo Wall, Double Wall, Triple Wall, Speed Wall, and the Final Wall.

Solo Wall 

After each team is announced, the team captain enters the play area. After a three-second countdown, the wall is shown. If the captain fails to "clear" the wall, either by falling into the pool or damaging the wall as it passes, the team earns zero points. Clearing the wall earns ten points. The opposing team captain then tries a different wall.

Double Wall 
The two non-captains on each team then compete on a Double Wall. The team earns twenty points if both players clear the wall. If either player fails to clear, they earn zero points.

Triple Wall 
The whole team competes in the Triple Wall. The team scores thirty points if all three clear the wall. If any player fails to clear, the team earns zero points.

Speed Wall 
Depends on the type of challenge is being selected, a random number of player is chosen for the round. The wall moves twice as fast as before. If a team member or more fell into the pool or broke a section of the wall, even with no players fell into the pool, they earn zero points. If they succeed, they earn points depend on the number of player in play. The winning teams get 10 million VND. While the loser team get 5 million VND.

Extra Wall 
If both teams tie, players compete in the bonus round to found the winning team.

Winner Wall 
After 4 rounds, a number of members of the winning teams face the final challenge. Challenges are also being randomized. Before the final round, the winning team will made a bet from 1 million VND to all of the winning cash. If they succeed, the winning team will earn bonus cash that they had bet. If not, they lose the money that they used to bet. They also got a trophy at the end.

Result

References 

List of television programmes broadcast by Vietnam Television (VTV)
Vietnam Television original programming
Non-Japanese television series based on Japanese television series